Devosia albogilva is a Gram-negative, aerobic, rod-shaped non-spore-forming bacteria from the genus of Devosia with a single polar flagellum which was isolated from a hexachlorocyclohexane
dump site in India.

References

External links
Type strain of Devosia albogilva at BacDive -  the Bacterial Diversity Metadatabase

 

Hyphomicrobiales
Bacteria described in 2009